Vibes is the original motion picture soundtrack album for the 1988 film with score by James Horner. The soundtrack does not contain the song "Hole in My Heart (All the Way to China)" by Cyndi Lauper and written by Richard Orange. The song was released as a 7" and 3" single.

Track listing
 "Main Title"  (score)
 "Andes Arrival" (score)
 "Mountain Trek"  (score)
 "The Secret Revealed" (score)
 "The Lost City" (score)
 "The Journey Begins" (score)
 "Silvia's Vision" (score)
 "Opening the Pyramid" (score)
 "End Title" (score)

Cyndi Lauper albums
1988 soundtrack albums
Columbia Records soundtracks
Film scores